Bryon Demetrise Russell (born December 31, 1970) is an American former professional basketball player. During a National Basketball Association (NBA) career that spanned from 1993 to 2006, he played for the Denver Nuggets, Washington Wizards and Los Angeles Lakers and was a key member of the Utah Jazz, helping them reach back-to-back NBA finals appearances in 1997 and 1998. Russell also played for the Hollywood Fame and Long Beach Breakers of the American Basketball Association (ABA). He finished his career with the Los Angeles Lightning of the International Basketball League (IBA), winning a championship in 2009.

NBA career
After playing three years of college basketball with Long Beach State University, Russell was drafted forty-fifth overall in the 1993 NBA draft by the Utah Jazz. From 1997 to 2000, he played in every regular-season game. He went to back-to-back NBA Finals with the Jazz in 1997 and 1998, but lost to the Chicago Bulls. Russell had his best season with the Jazz in the 1999–2000 season, when he averaged 14.1 points and 5.2 rebounds per game. After playing nine seasons for the Jazz, Russell signed with the Washington Wizards as a free agent for the 2002–2003 season. Russell then signed with the Los Angeles Lakers as a free agent for the 2003–2004 season and made it to the 2004 NBA Finals but lost to the Detroit Pistons. He then signed with the Denver Nuggets as a free agent and played with them from 2004 to 2006. He was a part of the Seattle SuperSonics roster for a brief time in 2006 after being traded by the Nuggets but never appeared in a game for them.

Russell's alma mater, Long Beach State University, retired his jersey in 2010.

Russell and Michael Jordan
Russell is best remembered for guarding Michael Jordan at the end of Game 6 of the 1998 NBA Finals. Jordan made the game-winning shot over Russell, although many fans believe Jordan pushed off Russell during the play. The referees did not call a foul on the play, and Russell later remarked, "Whether he pushed off or not, he was making that shot." He and Jordan were teammates when they played for the Washington Wizards during the 2002–03 NBA season, which was Jordan's last.

In 2009, Jordan mentioned Russell in his Hall of Fame induction speech, recalling an interaction they had during Jordan's first retirement in 1994: "[A]t this time, I had no thoughts of coming back and playing the game of basketball. Bryon Russell came over to me and said, 'Why did you quit? You know I could guard you.' ... From this day forward, if I ever see [Russell] in shorts, I'm coming at him." In response, Russell challenged Jordan to a game of one-on-one for charity. Such a match-up has not yet taken place, though the Utah Flash of the NBDL did stage a halftime game between Russell and a Jordan look-alike.

Career statistics

NBA statistics

Regular season

|-
| style="text-align:left;"| 
| style="text-align:left;"| Utah
| 67 || 48 || 16.7 || .484 || .091 || .614 || 2.7 || .8 || 1.0 || .3 || 5.0
|-
|  style="text-align:left;"| 
| style="text-align:left;"| Utah
| 63 || 15 || 13.7 || .437 || .295 || .667 || 2.2 || .5 || .8 || .2 || 4.5
|-
| style="text-align:left;"| 
| style="text-align:left;"| Utah
| 59 || 9 || 9.8 || .394 || .350 || .716 || 1.5 || .5 || .5 || .1 || 2.9
|-
| style="text-align:left;"| 
| style="text-align:left;"| Utah
| 81 || 81 || 31.2 || .479 || .409 || .701 || 4.1 || 1.5 || 1.6 || .3 || 10.8
|-
|  style="text-align:left;"| 
| style="text-align:left;"| Utah
| 82 || 7 || 27.1 || .430 || .341 || .766 || 4.0 || 1.2 || 1.1 || .4 || 9.0
|-
| style="text-align:left;"| 
| style="text-align:left;"| Utah
| 50 || 50 || 35.4 || .464 || .354 || .795 || 5.3 || 1.5 || 1.5 || .3 || 12.4
|-
|  style="text-align:left;"| 
| style="text-align:left;"| Utah
| 82 || 70 || 35.4 || .446 || .396 || .750 || 5.2 || 1.9 || 1.6 || .3 || 14.1
|-
| style="text-align:left;"| 
| style="text-align:left;"| Utah
| 78 || 46 || 31.7 || .440 || .413 || .779 || 4.2 || 2.1 || 1.2 || .3 || 12.0
|-
| style="text-align:left;"| 
| style="text-align:left;"| Utah
| 66 || 40 || 30.3 || .380 || .341 || .821 || 4.5 || 2.1 || 1.0 || .3 || 9.6
|-
| style="text-align:left;"| 
| style="text-align:left;"| Washington
| 70 || 23 || 19.8 || .353 || .329 || .768 || 3.0 || 1.0 || 1.0 || .1 || 4.5
|-
| style="text-align:left;"| 
| style="text-align:left;"| L.A. Lakers
| 72 || 1 || 13.1 || .402 || .384 || .769 || 2.0 || 1.0 || .4 || .2 || 4.0
|-
| style="text-align:left;"| 
| style="text-align:left;"| Denver
| 70 || 2 || 14.7 || .377 || .376 || .792 || 2.5 || 1.0 || .6 || .2 || 4.4
|-
| style="text-align:left;"| 
| style="text-align:left;"| Denver
| 1 || 0 || 3.0 || ... || ... || ... || 1.0 || 1.0 || .0 || .0 || .0
|- class=sortbottom
| style="text-align:center;" colspan=2| Career
| 841 || 392 || 23.5 || .431 || .369 || .750 || 3.5 || 1.3 || 1.0 || .2 || 7.9
|- class=sortbottom

Playoff statistics

|-
| style="text-align:left;"| 1994
| style="text-align:left;"| Utah
| 6 || 0 || 6.0 || .400 || .667 || 1.000 || 1.5 || .5 || .0 || .0 || 2.7
|-
|  style="text-align:left;"| 1995
| style="text-align:left;"| Utah
| 2 || 0 || 6.5 || .571 || .500 || .500 || 1.0 || 1.5 || .5 || .0 || 5.5
|-
| style="text-align:left;"| 1996
| style="text-align:left;"| Utah
| 18 || 0 || 25.5 || .468 || .472 || .816 || 4.2 || 1.2 || 1.3 || .5 || 9.6
|-
| style="text-align:left;"| 1997
| style="text-align:left;"| Utah
| 20 || 20 || 37.9 || .461 || .356 || .721 || 4.6 || 1.4 || 1.1 || .3 || 12.3
|-
|  style="text-align:left;"| 1998
| style="text-align:left;"| Utah
| 20 || 13 || 34.9 || .469 || .365 || .716 || 4.7 || 1.1 || 1.1 || .3 || 11.0
|-
| style="text-align:left;"| 1999
| style="text-align:left;"| Utah
| 11 || 11 || 35.2 || .426 || .250 || .722 || 6.1 || 1.2 || 1.8 || .2 || 12.1
|-
|  style="text-align:left;"| 2000
| style="text-align:left;"| Utah
| 10 || 10 || 37.1 || .421 || .289 || .756 || 5.4 || 2.1 || 1.6 || .5 || 14.0
|-
| style="text-align:left;"| 2001
| style="text-align:left;"| Utah
| 5 || 5 || 42.8 || .446 || .455 || .917 || 7.2 || 3.0 || .6 || .2 || 14.2
|-
| style="text-align:left;"| 2002
| style="text-align:left;"| Utah
| 4 ||4 || 30.0 || .250 || .400 || 1.000 || 4.3 || 1.8 || 1.0 || .0 || 7.0
|-
| style="text-align:left;"| 2004
| style="text-align:left;"| L.A. Lakers
| 6 || 0 || 2.7 || .000 || .000 || ... || .2 || .3 || .2 || .0 || .0
|-
| style="text-align:left;"| 2005
| style="text-align:left;"| Denver
| 3 || 0 || 3.0 || .000 || .000 || 1.000 || .0 || .0 || .0 || .0 || 1.0
|- class=sortbottom
| style="text-align:center;" colspan=2| Career
| 105 || 63 || 29.3 || .440 || .365 || .759 || 4.2 || 1.3 || 1.0 || .3 || 9.9
|-

References

External links

Greatest NBA clutch shots

1970 births
Living people
African-American basketball players
American men's basketball players
Basketball players from California
Denver Nuggets players
Long Beach State Beach men's basketball players
Los Angeles Lakers players
Small forwards
Sportspeople from San Bernardino, California
Utah Jazz draft picks
Utah Jazz players
Washington Wizards players
21st-century African-American sportspeople
20th-century African-American sportspeople